Ruganda is a sector in Karongi District, Western Province, Rwanda. The population in 2012 was 17,508.

References 

Western Province, Rwanda
Sectors of Rwanda